is a computer-animated children's television series co-produced by Mattel Creations, NHK, NHK Enterprises, and Polygon Pictures. It is a reboot based on the stop-motion television series Pingu by HIT Entertainment (The Pygos Group). The series first aired on NHK Educational TV in Japan from October 7, 2017, to March 30, 2019.

Premise 
The series was adapted from the famous stop-motion animated series Pingu, which was created in 1986 by Otmar Gutmann and Erika Brueggemann for the SRF in Switzerland. In the new series, Pingu and his family move from their home in the Antarctic to a large city, where the inhabitants are all very different. The mischievous and curious Pingu makes a big effort to help the citizens with their jobs, but his attempts to do so often result in trouble.

Production 
The series is co-produced by American company Mattel Creations and Japanese companies NHK, NHK Enterprises and Polygon Pictures, with animation produced by DandeLion Animation Studios in the same style as the original stop-motion series through computer-animation. It was directed by Naomi Iwata and written by both Kimeno Ueno and Shigenori Tanabe, with music by Ken Arai. It features voices by Ryota Iwasaki and Fumiya Tanaka, in a similar style to Carlo Bonomi, David Sant and Marcello Magni, who voiced characters in the original series.

International airings 
The series was first screened outside of Japan at the MIPJunior 2017 event at Cannes. In Australia, the show premiered on June 4, 2018 on ABC Kids, making that date with Pingu's return to Australian television. In the United States, the show was first screened at the Chicago International Television Festival and the 2018 Animation Block Party.

A second season premiered from October 6, 2018 (which was before the 1st anniversary of the show) to March 30, 2019.

In the United Kingdom, the show premiered on February 25, 2019 on ITVBe's preschool block LittleBe. In Brazil, the show premiered in April 2019 through the preschool channel Gloobinho. On Hop! Channel in Israel, it premiered in summer 2019.

Episodes

Season 1

Season 2

Home media releases

References

External links
 
 
 

Pingu
Japanese children's animated comedy television series
Polygon Pictures
NHK original programming
2017 Japanese television series debuts
2019 Japanese television series endings
Television series by Mattel Creations
Animated television series without speech